Lynn Bertholet (born 14 July 1959 in  Lausanne, originating from Rougemont,) is a transgender Swiss woman, bank executive and photomodel. She is also co-founder and chairperson of charity ÉPICÈNE, a volunteer public utility body which aims to welcome and support anyone facing transidentity issues.

Biography

Childhood 
Living since birth in the body of someone she called her “twin”, Lynn Bertholet grew up, studied and began her career under the first name Pierre-André. Her true identity appeared from early childhood with the desire to wear dresses and play with her sister's dolls. As an adolescent, she had difficulty experiencing the changes that puberty imposed on her body.

Studies 

Her father wanted her to become an engineer. She thus accepted, against her will, to study two years at the École Polytechnique Fédérale de Lausanne (EPFL). However, she decided to follow her own path by enrolling at HEC Lausanne, from which she gained a Master's degree in Political Economy in 1983, which was awarded the Credit Suisse prize for the best results obtained over the entire course. Her father, upset by her new orientation, nevertheless cut her off. She therefore had to finance her studies herself by working as a cab driver during the night. In 1994, she completed her studies with a diploma in "Program for Executive" awarded by the IMD business school. In 2019, she will continue her education with a course of study—on diversity and inclusion—culminating in a certificate in "Leadership for Executive LGBT" from the Stanford Graduate School of Business.

Professional career 

After graduating, she joined UBS Group AG in Geneva, then the Caisse d'Épargne located in the same city, which later merged with the Banque Hypothécaire, becoming the Banque cantonale de Genève (BCGE). She participated in the merger process by being part of the steering committee for the operation. She then continued her career at BCGE where she headed the department entitled “Affaires immobilières et entreprises de la construction” (“Real Estate and Construction Business”).

From 2002 to 2007, she taught at the Geneva School of Management and participated in the creation of the Certificate of Continuing Education in Compliance Management at the University of Geneva, a certificate which she co-directed until the end of 2006 and of which she was a member of the committee until the end of 2015. She taught in this program from 2003 to the end of 2019. From 2011 to 2020, she was deputy director of a private bank in Geneva and a member of the US Program Team. At the same time, she was also a member of the scientific committee of the Institut Supérieur de Formation Bancaire (ISFB), functions that she carried out under her true identity—Lynn Bertholet—since her transition on 19 October 2015, a key date that she has since then considered as her “second birth”.

Since 2019, she is now a member of the Board of Directors and Treasurer of Égides—Alliance internationale francophone pour l'égalité et les diversités—headquartered in Montreal and founded by the Government of Quebec.

ÉPICÈNE 

She was the first transgender woman in Geneva to get new identity papers even before going through surgery Subsequently, after two years of relentless legal proceedings, she even managed to force her health insurance company——to pay the full cost of her facial reconstruction, a symbolic act that, since then, she has always considered as having represented the ultimate step in the recovery of her identity. This encouraging outcome led her to advocate for a better medical, family and social integration of transidentity, both in Switzerland and in French-speaking countries around the world.

In the same vein, her restored identity has placed her under an additional challenge, which the German-speaking Swiss newspaper Schweizer Illustrierte highlighted in its 8 March 2019 edition:  She is also working actively in favour of a facilitated official and state recognition that is no longer subject to harassing evaluations. Indeed, such exhausting procedures, according to her, would be inappropriate as they would often prove to be dangerous, discriminatory and even stigmatizing when they confront the applicant with professionals insufficiently trained in the notion of transidentity. Her personal experience and background have therefore led her to realize the extent of the harmful effects triggered by these endless wandering processes which, in her opinion, are mainly based on the incompetence of many so-called “specialists” who have been randomly mandated for this purpose. As a result, she maintains that their arbitrary conclusions and anamnestic “verdicts”, most of the time, would end up with approximate or erroneous diagnoses.<ref name="Palma">{{cite journal|language=fr|date=30 October 2020|author=Delphine Palma, P. Wittge, J. Zaugg|publisher=Léman bleu|journal=Le Journal|title=Pénurie de chirurgiens spécialisés en réassignation sexuelle|url=http://www.lemanbleu.ch/fr/News/Penurie-de-chirurgiens-specialises-en-reassignation-sexuelle.html|quote=Cette réflexion sur le manque de formation des chirurgiens est aussi l'objet d'un combat que mène la présidente de l'association Epicène. "”C'est un désert médical, la situation est vraiment aride!” explique Lynn Bertholet [qui]  milite aujourd'hui pour qu'un centre spécialisé soit créé en Suisse.}}</ref>

Based on the above, the association ÉPICÈNE, co-founded by Lynn Bertholet, was thus created in August 2018.

In September 2020, under her impetus and co-direction, the aforementioned institution published a work—TRANS*''—whose content recounts the rehabilitating and reconstructive journey accomplished or endured by a number of personalities confronted with the archetype of transidentity.

Lynn Bertholet is also a member of the advisory commission on themes related to sexual orientation, gender identity, gender expression and sexual characteristics of the Canton of Geneva, as well as its sub-commissions on health and prevention.

Media

TV broadcasts 

 
 
 
 
 
 
 
  Summary

Radio broadcasts

Bibliography 

  240 p.
  Summary

References

External links 

 (in French)

People from the canton of Geneva
1959 births
Living people
Transgender female models
Transgender rights activists